Morgane Belkhiter (born 23 November 1995) is an Algerian international footballer who plays as a defender for ASJ Soyaux-Charente and the Algeria women's national football team. She competed for Algeria at the 2018 Africa Women Cup of Nations, playing in two matches.

References

External links
 

1995 births
Living people
Algerian women's footballers
Algeria women's international footballers
Women's association football defenders
Division 1 Féminine players
FC Metz (women) players
ASPTT Albi players
Olympique de Marseille (women) players
French women's footballers
Sportspeople from Bouches-du-Rhône
People from La Ciotat
French sportspeople of Algerian descent
Footballers from Provence-Alpes-Côte d'Azur